Marceau Somerlinck (4 January 1922 – 9 November 2005) was a French football player who played with Lille OSC. He won the Coupe de France a total of five times.

Honours
Lille
 Division 1: 1946, 1954
 Coupe de France: 1946, 1947, 1948, 1953, 1955

References

1922 births
2005 deaths
Association football defenders
French footballers
Lille OSC players
Ligue 1 players
SC Fives players